"Yeah Yeah U Know It" is the lead single released from Keith Murray's fourth album, He's Keith Murray. It featured verses from Murray's fellow Def Squad members, Erick Sermon and Redman and was produced by Just Blaze. "Yeah Yeah U Know It" just managed to make it to the Billboard 100, peaking at 99, and to date is Murray's final to make it the chart.

The single was released alongside "Fatty Girl", a collaboration with LL Cool J and Ludacris and G. Dep's "Special Delivery" remix with Murray, Ghostface Killah and Craig Mack.

Single track listing
"Yeah Yeah U Know It"- 4:12  
"Fatty Girl"- 3:55  
"Special Delivery" (Remix)- 4:39

Charts

2003 singles
Keith Murray (rapper) songs
Redman (rapper) songs
Song recordings produced by Just Blaze
Songs written by Erick Sermon
Def Jam Recordings singles
2003 songs
Songs written by Redman (rapper)